Aminata Nar Diop (born January 3, 1983) is a Senegalese basketball player.

References

External links
Profile at eurobasket.com
Georgetown profile

1983 births
Living people
People from Rufisque
Senegalese women's basketball players
Centers (basketball)
African Games gold medalists for Senegal
African Games medalists in basketball
Southeastern Illinois Falcons women's basketball players
Georgetown Hoyas women's basketball players
Competitors at the 2011 All-Africa Games
Sportspeople from Saint-Louis, Senegal